This is a list of international presidential trips made by Hassan Rouhani, the 7th President of Iran

Summary of international trips

2013
The following international trips were made by President Hassan Rouhani in 2013:

2014
The following international trips were made by President Hassan Rouhani in 2014:

2015
The following international trips were made by President Hassan Rouhani in 2015:

2016
The following international trips were made by President Hassan Rouhani in 2016:

2017
The following international trips were made by President Hassan Rouhani in 2017:

2018

The following international trips were made by President Hassan Rouhani in 2018:

2019

The following international trips were made by President Hassan Rouhani in 2019:

Multilateral meetings

See also
List of international trips made by presidents of Iran
List of state visits to Iran

References

Lists of 21st-century trips
Rouhani, Hassan
Rouhani, Hassan
Presidency of Hassan Rouhani